Skiddy is an unincorporated community in Morris County, Kansas, United States.

History
Skiddy was founded in 1870. It was named after railroad magnate Francis Skiddy. Between March 11, 1879, and August 3, 1883, it was renamed Camden.

The post office in Skiddy was discontinued in 1953. The Missouri–Kansas–Texas Railroad served Skiddy for many years, and the grain elevator adjacent to the railroad tracks still stands today.

Education
The community is served by Rural Vista USD 481 public school district.

References

Further reading

External links
 Skiddy - Lost Kansas Communities
 Morris County maps: Current, Historic, KDOT

Unincorporated communities in Morris County, Kansas
Unincorporated communities in Kansas